Wootton Bassett (foaled 4 February 2008) is a British-bred Thoroughbred racehorse and sire. He was one of the best two-year-old in Europe in 2010 when he was undefeated in five race including the Prix Jean-Luc Lagardère. He failed to win in 2011 and was retired from racing at the end of the year. He has had considerable success as a sire of winners.

Background
Wootton Bassett is a bay horse with a small white star bred in England by the Hertfordshire-based Laundry Cottage Stud. In September 2009 he was put up for auction at the Doncaster St Leger Yearling Sale and was bought for 44,000 guineas by Bobby O'Ryan. He entered the ownership of Frank Brady & The Cosmic Cases and was sent into training with Richard Fahey at Malton, North Yorkshire.

He was sired by Iffraaj, who won the Group 2 Park Stakes twice and the Lennox Stakes once, as well as finishing second in the 2006 July Cup. His other progeny have included Rizeena, Chriselliam and Ribchester. Wootton Bassett's dam Balladonia showed some racing ability, winning one of her eighteen races and twice finishing placed in the Listed Hoppings Stakes. She was a granddaughter of the American broodmare Gliding By (foaled 1975), making her a close relative of to Silver Patriarch.

Racing career

2010: two-year-old season
Wootton Bassett began his racing career in a maiden race over six furlongs at Ayr Racecourse on 19 June in which he was ridden by Tony Hamilton and won by one and a quarter lengths from five opponents at odds of 11/4. He was ridden in all of his subsequent races by Paul Hanagan. On 15 July at Doncaster Racecourse the colt startes 2/5 favourite for a six furlong novice race (for horses with no more than two previous wins) and won by two lengths from Forjatt after leading from the start. At York Racecourse on 19 August Wootton Bassett started 5/4 favourite for the DBS Premier Yearling Stakes, a valuable event restricted to juveniles sold at Doncaster in the previous year. He disputed the lead from the start and drew ahead of his rivals in the final furlong to win by one and three quarter lengths from Galtymore Lad. In another valuable sales race, the Weatherbys Insurance £300,000 2-Y-O Stakes, at Doncaster Racecourse on 9 September, the colt defeated Galtymore Lad again, staying on strongly in the closing stages to win by a length.

For his final run of the year Wootton Bassett was sent to France and stepped up in class to contest the Prix Jean-Luc Lagardère over 1400 metres on very soft ground at Longchamp Racecourse on 3 October. He started second favourite behind the filly Moonlight Cloud in a nine-runner field which also included My Name Is Bond (winner of the Prix La Rochette), Tin Horse (runner-up in the Prix Morny) and King Torus (Vintage Stakes). Wootton Bassett took the lead son after the start, opened up a clear advantage 500 metres from the finish, and came home two and a half lengths clear of Maiguri and Tin Horse, who dead-heated for second place. Hanagan commented: "The race went perfectly to plan for us and really it's all about enjoying the moment. I've waited such a long time for my first Group One and now it has happened", while Richard Fahey said "We wanted to make plenty of use of him as we felt he would stay well. He's the first proper Group horse I have had since Utmost Respect, and you would have to look down the Classic route now. I put him in the Irish Guineas a while ago and I will put him in the English and French Guineas as well."

2011: three-year-old season
Wootton Bassett began his second campaign at Longchamp on 15 May when he started favourite for the Poule d'Essai des Poulains but after leading for most of the way he was overtaken in the last 200 metres and sustained his first defeat as came home fifth of the fourteen runners behind Tin Horse. At Royal Ascot in June he made little impact in the St James's Palace Stakes as he finished seventh behind Frankel beaten fourteen lengths by the winner. Wootton Bassett was dropped back to sprint distances for his two remaining races but failed to recover his juvenile form as he finished fifth behind Moonlight Cloud in the Prix Maurice de Gheest at Deauville Racecourse in August and thirteenth behind Dream Ahead in the Haydock Sprint Cup on 3 September.

Stud record
Wootton Bassett was retired from racing to become a breeding stallion. He was based at the Haras d'Etreham in France before being sold to stand for the Coolmore Stud in 2020.

Notable progeny

Wootton Bassett's 5 Group One winners:

c = colt, f = filly, g = gelding

Pedigree

References

2008 racehorse births
Racehorses bred in the United Kingdom
Racehorses trained in the United Kingdom
Thoroughbred family 2-n